Chilenodes is a monotypic genus of spiders in the family Malkaridae. It was first described by Platnick & Forster in 1987. , it contains only one species, Chilenodes australis, found in Chile and Argentina.

References

Malkaridae
Monotypic Araneomorphae genera
Spiders of South America